The 2009 Minnesota Golden Gophers football team was the third under head coach Tim Brewster.  They began play on September 5, 2009, at Syracuse, a member of the Big East Conference.  On September 12, the Minnesota opened the new TCF Bank Stadium with a 20–13 win against Air Force, moving from the Metrodome, which had been their home stadium since 1982. The Golden Gophers finished the season 6–7 and 3–5 in Big Ten play and lost 13–14 to Iowa State in the Insight Bowl. Despite the worse overall record, the Golden Gophers only suffered two blowout losses in the 2009 season (20-0 to Penn State and 38–7 to Ohio State), compared to 3 in 2008 (55–0 to Iowa, 42–21 to Kansas, 29–6 to a 3–9 Michigan team, and one could possibly also include a 34–21 loss to Ohio State that was 34–6 until the Buckeye reserves came in).

Preseason
The Golden Gophers came off a 7–6 season after starting 7–1, capped by an appearance in the 2008 Insight Bowl. On January 6, offensive coordinator Mike Dunbar resigned and defensive coordinator Ted Roof left Minnesota for Auburn.  On January 9, former Nebraska defensive coordinator Kevin Cosgrove was hired as the co-defensive coordinator, a position he will share with Ronnie Lee.  On January 21, Jedd Fisch was named the offensive coordinator.  He had previously been the wide receivers coach for the Denver Broncos.

Schedule

Regular season

Syracuse

Air Force

California

Northwestern

Wisconsin

Purdue

Penn State

Ohio State

Michigan State

Illinois

South Dakota State

Iowa

Insight Bowl

Iowa State

Awards and honors

References

Minnesota
Minnesota Golden Gophers football seasons
Minnesota Golden Gophers football